Hippotion irregularis is a moth of the family Sphingidae. It is known from forests from Liberia to Congo, Uganda and western Kenya. It is also found in the Usambara area of Tanzania.

References

 Pinhey, E. (1962): Hawk Moths of Central and Southern Africa. Longmans Southern Africa, Cape Town.

Hippotion
Moths described in 1856
Moths of Africa